The Irkliiv Regiment was one the territorial-administrative subdivisions of the Cossack Hetmanate. The regiment's capital was the city of Irkliiv, now a village in Cherkasy Oblast of central Ukraine.

In 1648, during Khmelnytsky Uprising, Regiment was raised from the Irkliiv sotnia of the Pereyaslav Regiment. Colonel Mykhailo Teliuchenko became the first commander. On 16 October 1649 Irkliiv and neighboring part of Lubny Regiment were merged to form Kropyvna Regiment. Other sotnias were absorbed into Chyhyryn Regiment and Cherkasy Regiment.

Hetman Ivan Vyhovsky disbanded Kropyvna Regiment in 1658 after death of colonel Filon Dzhelaliy. The regiments sotnias were all transferred to recreated Irkliiv Regiment and Lubny Regiment. Matvii Pankevych became the new regiments colonel. When the regiment was disbanded again in 1663, its sotnias went to neighbouring Pereyaslav Regiment, Pryluky Regiment and Lubny Regiment.

Structure
The regiment comprised 5 sotnias during 1648-1649:
 Irkliiv
 Veremiivka
 Vasiutyntsi
 Burimka
 Mali Kanivtsi

The regiment comprised 8 sotnias during 1658-1663:
 Denhy
 Zhuravka
 Irkliiv 1st
 Irkliiv 2nd
 Irkliiv 3rd
 Kropyvna
 Kurinka
 Orzhytsia

Commanders
 Mykhailo Teliuchenko 1648-1649
 Matvii Pankevych (Papkevych, Papievych) 1658-Mid 1663

References

Sources 

Cossack Hetmanate Regiments
History of Cherkasy Oblast